Pierre-Yves Corthals (born 23 October 1975 in Liège) is a Belgian auto racing driver.

Career
After competing in karting, Corthals began racing in the Belgian Renault Clio Cup in 1994, which he went on to win for three consecutive years between 1995 and 1997, and won it again in 2000 and 2004. He won the International Clio Cup in 2001, ahead of Alessandro Balzan and Jeroen Bleekemolen.

In 2001 he competed in two rounds of the European Touring Car Championship, once for BMW Team RBM at Donington Park, and once for Carly Motorsport at Circuit de Spa-Francorchamps, finishing the first race in sixth place.

Corthals began competing in the World Touring Car Championship in 2006, for JAS Motorsport in a Honda Accord, finishing seventh in the Independents' Trophy.

He moved onto Exagon Engineering in 2007, driving a SEAT León. He improved to finish third in the Independents' Trophy standings. He remained with Exagon for 2008, finishing fourth in the Independents' standings. He did not return in 2009, instead competing in the Belgian Touring Car Series.

Corthals is a regular competitor in the 24 Hours of Spa.

Racing record

Complete World Touring Car Championship results
(key) (Races in bold indicate pole position) (Races in italics indicate fastest lap)

† Driver did not finish the race, but was classified as he completed over 90% of the race distance.

Complete TCR International Series results
(key) (Races in bold indicate pole position) (Races in italics indicate fastest lap)

† Driver did not finish the race, but was classified as he completed over 90% of the race distance.

TCR Spa 500 results

References

External links
Official website

Living people
1975 births
Belgian racing drivers
FIA GT Championship drivers
World Touring Car Championship drivers
Sportspeople from Liège
24 Hours of Spa drivers
European Touring Car Championship drivers
TCR Europe Touring Car Series drivers